This is a list of broadcast television stations serving cities in the Canadian province of Saskatchewan.

Defunct stations
Channel 4: CHAB-TV - CBC - Moose Jaw
Channel 5: CKBI-TV - CBC - Prince Albert
Channel 5: CJFB-TV - CBC - Swift Current
Channel 5: CKOS-TV - CBC - Yorkton
Channel 11: CBKST - CBC - Saskatoon

See also
List of television stations in Canada
Media in Canada

References

Saskatchewan

Television stations